This is the discography for Canadian hard rock group The Tea Party.

Albums

Studio albums

Compilation albums

Live albums

Demos

EPs

Singles

Music videos
 "Let Me Show You the Door", 1991 (Scott Souliere and Stuart Grant – filmed in Windsor and Detroit)
 "The River", 1993 (Floria Sigismondi – Toronto)
 "Save Me", 1993 (Floria Sigismondi – Toronto)
 "A Certain Slant of Light", 1994 (Floria Sigismondi – Sydney)
 "Shadows on the Mountainside", 1995 (George Vail – Paris, Ontario)
 "Fire in the Head", 1995 (Dean Karr – Los Angeles)
 "The Bazaar", 1995 (George Vail – Istanbul)
 "Sister Awake", 1996 (Curtis Wehrfritz – Toronto)
 "Temptation", 1997 (Tyran George – Toronto)
 "Babylon", 1997 (Tyran George – Toronto)
 "Release", 1998 (Ulf Buddensieck – Paris and Toronto)
 "Psychopomp", 1998 (Adam Kowalchuk – live on MuchMusic, Toronto)
 "Heaven Coming Down", 1999 (Ulf Buddensieck – Toronto)
 "The Messenger", 1999 (George Vail – Toronto)
 "Walking Wounded", 2000 (George Vail – Havana)
 "Lullaby", 2001 (Don Allan and Miroslav Bazak – Toronto)
 "Angels", 2001 (Craig Bernard – Toronto)
 "Writing's on the Wall", 2004 (Stuart Chatwood and Stephen Scott – Toronto)
 "Stargazer", 2004 (Don Allan – Toronto)
 "Oceans", 2005 (Stuart Chatwood, Jaimie Webster and Jonathon Corbiére – animated by York University students)
 "The Black Sea", 2014 (Tim Smith – Melbourne)
 "Water's On Fire", 2014
 "The Ocean At The End", 2015 (George Vale – Toronto)
"Black River", 2018
"Way Way Down", 2019 (Directed by Kyle Mosonyi)
"Isolation", 2020 (Directed by Bill Blair)

Videography 
Illuminations (2001), certified platinum in Canada
Live: Intimate & Interactive (2007)

References

Discographies of Canadian artists